Dasylepis may refer to:
 Dasylepis (plant), a genus of flowering plants in the family Achariaceae
 Dasylepis (fish), a fossil genus of fishes in the family Thelodontidae
 Dasylepis, a genus of annelids in the family Polynoidae; synonym of Harmothoe